Triaenodes is a genus of long-horned caddisflies in the family Leptoceridae. There are at least 170 described species in Triaenodes.

The type species for Triaenodes is Leptocerus bicolor J. Curtis.

See also
 List of Triaenodes species

References

Further reading

External links

 

Trichoptera genera
Integripalpia